Písek is a town in the South Bohemian Region of the Czech Republic. It has about 30,000 inhabitants. The town centre is well preserved and is protected by law as an urban monument zone.

Písek is colloquially called "South Bohemian Athens", because it has many high schools and schools of higher education, including the Film School in Písek. Up to the last decades of 19th century Písek was the centre of the large autonomous Prácheňsko region.

Administrative parts

Písek is made up of five town parts and four villages:

Budějovické Předměstí
Hradiště
Pražské Předměstí
Václavské Předměstí
Vnitřní Město
Nový Dvůr
Purkratice
Semice
Smrkovice

Etymology
The name of Písek literally means "sand". It refers to the sand of the Otava River, which was panned for gold by the first settlers.

Geography
Most of the municipal territory lies in the Tábor Uplands, but the southern part lies in the České Budějovice Basin. There are several steep streets and some suburbs lie more than 70–90 metres above the town centre. The eastern part of the territory, known as the Písecké hory Nature Park, is covered by deciduous woodlands mixed with high number of various coniferous trees.

The town is situated on both banks of the river Otava. In the municipal territory there are several brooks with many fish ponds. The largest of the ponds are Prostřední Putim and Stará Putim.

Climate

The climate in Písek is known to have a milder and drier microclimate because it is well protected from all sides against winds. Písek enjoys a cool inland version of a humid continental climate (Dfb) with rather balanced temperatures year round and rare deep negative extremes. Lying in a rainshadow causes relatively low precipitations, vastly in form of rain (539 mm/annum).

The town is sunnier than its wind-prone high-grounded vicinity with some 1,750 hours of sunshine with the most sunlight occurring between March and September, and murky period between November and January. While last spring frost was recorded on May 18 and the first autumn frost was recorded on 18 September, i.e. 121 days without any frost (33.1% of the year), most years have frost-free period between early-April until mid of October (6+ months).

Nevertheless, number of days with at least  is normally 56 per a year. Písek has typically great differences between daily minimal and maximal temperatures due to its position far inland.

History

The predecessor of the town was a settlement of the area where gold was panned, which later became a market village with the royal court. In 1254, King Ottokar II founded here a royal town. During his reign, the town grew and its importance increased. A castle was built above the ford across the Otava river,a monastery was founded, and Písek Stone Bridge was built. Also, at the end of the 13th century, the mint was founded, later moved to Kutná Hora.

From 1308, Písek was a free imperial town, and in the 14th century, Písek became the administrative centre of Prácheňsko region. Under the rule of Charles IV, the salt and grain warehouses were founded, and were the largest in Bohemia. For centuries, the town of Písek was the holder of the largest urban estate in Bohemia, especially forests.

During the Hussite Wars, Písek was conquered by the Hussites and the monastery was razed. During the Thirty Years' War in 1619–1620, the town was conquered and most of its inhabitants killed by the army of Charles de Longueval, Count of Bucquoy. In 1623, Písek was acquired by the royal chamber again, and in 1641, it was once again promoted to a royal town. In the 18th century, it became the centre of Prácheňsko again.

In the 19th century, Písek became the centre of education because several schools of higher education were established here.

Demographics

Economy
There is the Industrial Zone Sever in Pražské Předměstí part of Písek. The largest industrial employers in Písek are S.N.O.P. CZ, Aisin Europe Manufacturing Czech, and Faurecia Components Písek, all three engaged in the production of automotive parts. Other large town's employer is the Písek Hospital.

Transport
Písek is connected by the D4 motorway to Prague and by the I/20 and I/29 highways. The I/20 travels northwest to Plzeň and southeast to České Budějovice, while the I/29 travels east to Tábor.

Písek railway station lies on the Zdice–Protivín and Tábor–Ražice rail lines.

Culture
Since 2007, there has been a tradition of creating and exhibiting giant sand sculptures on the waterfront of the Otava River in the summer. Each year a different theme is chosen for the sculptures.

Sights

Písek has a well-preserved, medieval centre formed by larger Velké Square and small Alešovo Square with number of narrow alleys. The most valuable monument is Písek Stone Bridge, a national cultural monument. It was the second stone bridge in Bohemia and it is the oldest preserved bridge in country. It is also one of the oldest preserved bridges in whole Europe.

Sacral buildings
There are six churches in Písek, four of them in the town centre. One of the town's main landmarks is the Deanery Church of the Nativity of the Virgin Mary from the mid-13th century, old as the town itself. The church tower is open to the public and serves as a lookout tower.

The Church of the Exaltation of the Holy Cross is located on the central square commemorates the former Dominican Monastery destroyed by Hussites in 1419.

The Church of Saint Wenceslaus is located in Václavské Předměstí part of Písek. Existence of a sacral building in the area is documented already in around 1200, Church of Saint Wenceslaus was first mentioned in 1378. The original church was demolished in the mid-16th century and a new Gothic-Renaissance church was built on its foundations. In 1695–1697, it was rebuilt into the Baroque style. Today it is known for the unique fresco of Jan Hus being burned in Konstanz from around 1550, the oldest painting of his burning in the world.

Castle and town walls
The Písek Castle is a partly preserved Gothic castle, rebuilt into the town hall and a brewery. It also houses the Prácheňsko Museum, part of its exhibition is a preserved Gothic hall from the 13th century.

There are several preserved remains of the town fortifications in Písek, including two castle bastions and fragments of the town walls.

Notable people

Ottokar II of Bohemia (c.1233–1278), Bohemian king
Adolf Heyduk (1835–1923), poet
August Sedláček (1843–1926), historian
Otakar Ševčík (1852–1934), violinist
Josef Holeček (1853–1929), writer
Fráňa Šrámek (1877–1952), writer and poet
Jan Mukařovský (1891–1975), literature theorist
John Juzek (1892–c.1965), exporter of orchestral string instruments
Ferdinand Hart (1893–1937), actor
George Mraz (born 1944), bassist
Kateřina Neumannová (born 1973), cross-country skier
Tomáš Zíb (born 1976), tennis player
Tomáš Verner (born 1986), figure skater
Jan Rutta (born 1990), ice hockey player

Twin towns – sister cities

Písek is twinned with:

 Caerphilly, Wales, United Kingdom
 Deggendorf, Germany
 Lemvig, Denmark
 Smiltene, Latvia
 Veľký Krtíš, Slovakia
 Wetzlar, Germany

Písek also has friendly relations with Jičín in the Czech Republic and Bad Leonfelden in Austria.

References

External links

Official tourist portal 
Online webcam in the centre of Písek

 
Cities and towns in the Czech Republic
Populated places in Písek District
Prácheňsko